Opistognathidae, the jawfishes, are a family of fishes which have been classified within the order Perciformes, suborder Percoidei but many authorities now classify this family within the clade Ovalentaria and consider that its affinities within that clade are uncertain, i.e. it is incertae sedis. The family includes about 80 species. They are native to warmer parts of the Atlantic, Pacific and Indian Oceans, where found from the shallows to depths of a few hundred meters. The species level taxonomy is complex and the family includes several undescribed species.

Physically similar to blennies, most jawfish species are small fish (up to ) with an elongated body plan. Their heads, mouths, and eyes are large in size relative to the rest of their bodies. Jawfishes possess a single, long dorsal fin with 9-12 spines and a caudal fin that can be either rounded or pointed.

Jawfishes typically reside in burrows they construct in sandy substrate. They will stuff their mouths with sand and spit it out elsewhere, slowly creating a tunnel. Using the protection of these burrows, these fish will hover, feeding on plankton or other small organisms, ready to dart back in at the first sign of danger. They are territorial of the area around their burrows.

With the exception of the blue-spotted jawfish O. rosenblatti, Jawfishes are mouthbrooders, meaning their eggs hatch in their mouths, where the newborn fry are protected from predators.

The gestation period varies between species. Gold-specs jawfish (Opistognathus randalli) typically keep their clutch of eggs for 8–10 days before hatching.

Timeline

Genera
The following four genera are classified under the family:

 Anoptoplacus Smith-Vaniz, 2017
 Lonchopisthus T.N. Gill, 1862
 Opistognathus Cuvier, 1816
 Stalix D.S. Jordan & Snyder, 1902

References

 
Ovalentaria
Ray-finned fish families
Taxa named by Charles Lucien Bonaparte